Zuz or ZUZ may refer to:

Zuz (Jewish coin), an ancient Hebrew silver coin
Zentrale Unterstützungsgruppe Zoll, the special operations group of the German customs service